Armathia is a Greek island belonging to the Dodecanese group in the eastern Aegean sea. It is part of the municipality of Kasos. In the census of 1951 there were 8 recorded inhabitants but it has since become uninhabited. At its peak it sustained a community of over 100 who were mainly involved in mining the rich deposits of gypsum intended for export. It is now a tourist destination for day trippers from neighbouring developed islands. The recently constructed observatory attracts wildlife observers.

External links
Official website of the Municipality of Kasos (in Greek)

Islands of Greece